Grega Žemlja was the defending champion, but decided not to participate.

Marinko Matosevic won the title, defeating Greg Jones in the final, 6–0, 6–2.

Seeds

Draw

Finals

Top half

Bottom half

References
 Main Draw
 Qualifying Draw

Sin
2012 Singles